Dolní Kounice is a town in Brno-Country District in the South Moravian Region of the Czech Republic. It has about 2,500 inhabitants.

Geography
It lies in the Bobrava Highlands.

History

The first written mention of Kounice is from 1183, when a Premonstratensian Rosa coeli convent was built here. It was founded in 1181 and was the oldest convent in Moravia. A church already stood here in 1183. In 1284–1330, a Gothic convent castle was built here. Since the 15th century, the village has been named Dolní Kounice.

In 1527, the convent was abolished. An attempt was made to restore it in 1702, but a year later it was destroyed by a fire and never restored again.

From 1537, the manor was owned by various noble families. In 1571, Dolní Kounice was promoted to a town and obtained coat of arms. During the rule of the Drnovský of Drnovice family in 1588–1622, the castle was rebuilt into a Renaissance fortified residence. During the Thirty Year's War in 1622, the castle was burned down, and was repaired in 1682 in the Baroque style. From 1622 to 1862, Dolní Kounice Castle with the manor was property of the Dietrichstein family, which was its most famous and longest owners.

In 1964, Dolní Kounice lost the title a town. The title was returned to it in 1998.

Sights

Dolní Kounice is known for the Gothic-Renaissance castle and for ruins of the convent. The castle is gradually being repaired and since 2007 has been open to the public.

The Church of Saints Peter and Paul on the town square is a neo-Renaissance structure from 1877–1879. The Chapel of Saint Anthony is a landmark above the town. The way to the pilgrimage chapel is lined by Stations of the Cross.

There are several monument commemorating the Jewish community in the town. The Dolní Kounice Synagogue was built in the early Baroque style in 1652–1655 and is one of the oldest synagogues in Moravia. The Jewish cemetery was founded in 1680.

Notable people
Gotthard Deutsch (1859–1921), Austrian scholar
Jan Helcelet (1812–1878), naturalist and politician
Antonín Brabec (1946–2017), canoeist

Twin towns – sister cities

Dolní Kounice is twinned with:
 Azay-le-Brûlé, France
 Caprese Michelangelo, Italy

Gallery

References

External links

 

Cities and towns in the Czech Republic
Populated places in Brno-Country District